Rick L. Olson (born 1951) is the Iowa State Representative from the 39th District. A Democrat, he has served in the Iowa House of Representatives since 2005.  Olson was born, raised, and resides in Des Moines, Iowa.  He attended Grandview College and received his undergraduate degree and his J.D. from Drake University.

, Olson serves on several committees in the Iowa House – the Judiciary, Public Safety, and Transportation committees.  He also serves as a member of the Justice System Appropriations Subcommittee.

Electoral history
*incumbent

References

External links

 Representative Rick Olson official Iowa General Assembly site
 
 Financial information (state office) at the National Institute for Money in State Politics

1951 births
Date of birth missing (living people)
Living people
Democratic Party members of the Iowa House of Representatives
Politicians from Des Moines, Iowa
Grand View University alumni
21st-century American politicians
Drake University Law School alumni